Atišta is a village in the municipality of Kičevo, North Macedonia. It used to be part of the former Vraneštica Municipality.

History
The village contains the archaeological site Arbanasi, a village from Late Antiquity. The name is derived from the old South Slavic ethnonym Arbanas, literally meaning Albanian, which suggests either direct linguistic contact with Albanians or the former presence of an Albanian community.

Demographics

According to the 2002 census, the village had a total of 31 inhabitants. Ethnic groups in the village include:

Macedonians 31

Culture
The main village church, built in 1936, is dedicated to Saint Demetrius.

References

Villages in Kičevo Municipality